Judo competitions at the 2015 Pan American Games in Toronto were held from July 11 to 14 at the Hershey Centre (Mississauga Sports Centre) in Mississauga. Due to naming rights the arena was known as the latter for the duration of the games. A total of fourteen judo events were held: seven each for men and women.

Competition schedule

The following was the competition schedule for the judo competitions:

Medal table

Medalists

Men's events

Women's events

Participating nations
A total of 19 countries have qualified athletes. The number of athletes a nation has entered is in parentheses beside the name of the country.

Qualification

A total of 140 judokas (ten per weight category) will qualify to compete at the games. There will be six qualification events for athletes to earn ranking points, and the top nine nations qualify per event. The host nation (Canada) is automatically qualified in each event, for a total of ten per event. If the host nations is not ranked in the top ten places, Canada will take the place of the tenth ranked nation. If Canada is ranked in the top nine nations, the tenth ranked nation will qualify instead. A nation may enter a maximum of one athlete per weight category.

See also
Judo at the 2016 Summer Olympics

References

External links
 

 
2015
Events at the 2015 Pan American Games
American Games
Judo competitions in Canada
International sports competitions hosted by Canada